The James Buckley House is a historic house located on Joseph Street in Cape Vincent, Jefferson County, New York.

Description and history 
It is a -story frame structure built in about 1845 in the Gothic Cottage style. The central section is flanked by one-story wings with parapets hiding the shed roof.

It was listed on the National Register of Historic Places on September 27, 1985.

References

Houses on the National Register of Historic Places in New York (state)
Gothic Revival architecture in New York (state)
Houses completed in 1845
Houses in Jefferson County, New York
National Register of Historic Places in Jefferson County, New York